Stefan Einhorn (born October 26, 1955, in Stockholm) is a Swedish doctor, professor and writer. He is the son of Jerzy and Nina Einhorn, as well as the brother of Lena Einhorn.

Biography
He received a degree from the Karolinska Institute in 1980 after presenting his thesis. In 1999 he became a professor of Molecular oncology  at the Karolinska Institute. In 2013, he co-launched a Center for Social Sustainability (CSS) at the institute. He is also a general practitioner at Radiumhemmet and chairman of the Karolinska Institute's ethics council. Einhorn is also an active member of the Swedish Authors' Association.

Activities
Einhorn hosted a summer radio program on June 25, 2002, and was the guest on the TV-huset television program on November 20, 2005.

Popular books
1991 – Hud i sol (med Cecilia Boldeman)
1992 – En liten bok om cancer (Cancerfonden)
2000 – Ont i kroppen (med Ralph Nisell)

Other books
1998 – En dold Gud: om religion, vetenskap och att söka Gud
2003 – Den sjunde dagen
2005 – Konsten att vara snäll
2007 – Medmänniskor
2007 – Vägar till visdom
2011 – Änglarnas svar
2013 – Stenträdet (spänningsroman)
2014 – De nya dödssynderna: våra mörkaste sidor och hur vi kan hantera dem
2016 – Pappan

References

1955 births
Living people
Swedish male writers
Swedish-language writers
Swedish oncologists
Karolinska Institute alumni
Academic staff of the Karolinska Institute
Swedish Jews
Swedish people of Polish-Jewish descent